The Fir of Drenovë National Park is a national park near Korçë in eastern Albania, with an area of .

The park falls within the Illyrian deciduous forests and Dinaric Alpine mixed forests terrestrial ecoregion of the Palearctic temperate broadleaf and mixed forest, dominated by the Silver fir. The diverse morphological, climatic and hydrological conditions of the region favour the formation of a variety of geological features. The national park is host to many rock formations such as the Stone of Capi, the Cut stone, the Zhombrit’s Pyramide, Cave of Tren but also many water features such as the Lenies Lakes, and the Karstic Cavity. All these are under protections and declared as natural landmarks by the Government of Albania.

See also    
 Geography of Albania
 Protected areas of Albania
 Biodiversity of Albania

References 

 

National parks of Albania
Protected areas of Korçë County
Forests of Albania